Beaussac is a former commune in the Dordogne department in Nouvelle-Aquitaine region in southwestern France. On 1 January 2017, it was merged into the new commune Mareuil en Périgord.

The community is located in the Périgord Limousin Regional Nature Park.

History 
On Cassini's early map of France between 1756 and 1789, the village is identified as the Beaussat. In 1793, it is Baussac and in 1801, it is back to Beaussat.

Geography 
The Lizonne forms the commune's southern border. The stream of Beaussac (ruisseau de Beaussac), a tributary of the Lizonne, forms the commune's southeastern border and part of the commune's southwestern border, separating it from Puyrenier and Rudeau-Ladosse.

Transportation 
Airports
 Angoulême 
 Périgueux (Bassillac) 
 Cognac

Tourism 
 Barouty Cave (grotto) in Pranzac 
 Golf de la Prèze (18-hole golf course) in Montbron 
  – a private mansion located on the Périgord in Beaussac. Overlooking the Nizonne valley, it has been a registered historic monument since 1948.

Personalities
 Alain de Monéys – member of the city council and first Deputy Mayor of Beaussac. Monéys was killed in 1870 by villagers in Hautefaye, after his report of the Franco-Prussian War was perceived to support the enemy. The case was mentioned in the 2009 romance of Jean Teulé, entitled Mangez-le si vous voulez.

Population

See also
Communes of the Dordogne department

References

Further reading 
 Corbin, Alain. Le village des "cannibales", Aubier, 1990
 Marbeck, Georges. Hautefaye, l'année terrible, Robert Laffont, 1982
 Teulé, Jean. Mangez-le si vous voulez, Éditions Julliard, 2009.

External links 

 

Former communes of Dordogne